Castelo de Juromenha is a castle in Portugal located in Juromenha. It is classified by IGESPAR as a Site of Public Interest.

Juromenha